Major facilitator superfamily domain-containing protein 2 (MFSD2 or MFSD2A) -- also known as sodium-dependent lysophosphatidylcholine symporter 1 --  is a protein that in humans is encoded by the MFSD2A gene. MFSD2A is a membrane transport protein that is expressed in the endothelium of the blood–brain barrier (BBB) and has an essential role in BBB formation and function. Genetic ablation of MFSD2A results in leaky BBB and increases central nervous system endothelial cell vesicular transcytosis without otherwise affecting tight junctions. MFSD2A is an atypical SLC, thus a predicted SLC transporter. It clusters phylogenetically to AMTF8.

In addition to transport of other lysophosphatidylcholines across the BBB, MSFD2A is the primary mechanism for docosahexaenoic acid (DHA, an omega-3 fatty acid) uptake and transport into the brain. It may also be responsible for uptake and transport of tunicamycin.

Complete loss of MFSD2A in human leads to a recessive lethal microcephaly syndrome consisting of enlarged lateral ventricles and underdevelopment of the cerebellum and brainstem.  This is presumably due to loss of uptake of essential polyunsaturated fatty acids by the brain endothelial cells, which utilize MFSD2A as a transporter for these fats.  Serum from patients showed elevated levels of essential polyunsaturated fatty acids, presumably due to the inability of vascular cells to uptake these lipids in the absence of protein function. Without the ability to uptake these fats into endothelial cells, there is breakdown of the blood-brain-barrier and loss of brain volume.  This was demonstrated in a zebrafish model by intracardiac injection of dye, which was found to extravasate into the brain parenchyma following  inactivating one of the paralogues of MSFD2A known as mfsd2aa.

References

Further reading